Baynes is a surname. Notable people with the surname include:

 Adam Baynes, English politician
 Aron Baynes (born 1986), New Zealand-born Australian basketball player
 Helton Godwin Baynes, (1882–1943), analytical psychologist, author, translator of Carl Jung
 James Baynes (1766–1837), English painter
 Norman Hepburn Baynes (1877–1961), British historian of the Byzantine Empire
 Pauline Baynes (born 1922), English illustrator
 Robert Lambert Baynes (1796–1869), British naval officer
 Simon Baynes, British politician
 Stephen Baynes (born 1956), Australian dancer
 Sydney Baynes (1879–1938), British conductor and composer
 Thomas Mann Baynes (1794–1876), English artist, son of James Baynes
 Thomas Spencer Baynes (1823–1887), English philosopher

Fictional characters:
 Inspector Baynes, from the Sherlock Holmes story The Adventure of Wisteria Lodge

See also
 Baynes Island, Tasmania, Australia
 Baynes Sound, British Columbia, Canada
 Baines